Coleophora bitlisella is a moth of the family Coleophoridae that can be found in Iran and Turkey.

References

External links

bitlisella
Moths of Asia
Moths described in 1994